Selina Freitag (born 19 May 2001) is a German ski jumper. She won the overall ranking of the 2016–17 FIS Ski Jumping Alpen Cup, and has competed at World Cup level since the 2018–19 season. Her best individual result is second place, achieved on two occasions in 2023. At the 2019 Nordic Junior World Ski Championships, she won a silver medal in the team event and a bronze medal in the mixed-team event.

Her brother Richard Freitag is also a former ski jumper.

Nordic World Ski Championships results

References

External links

2001 births
Living people
German female ski jumpers
Ski jumpers at the 2022 Winter Olympics
Olympic ski jumpers of Germany
21st-century German women
FIS Nordic World Ski Championships medalists in ski jumping